Super Session is an album by Al Kooper, with guitarists Mike Bloomfield on the first half and Stephen Stills on the second half of the album. Released by Columbia Records in 1968, it peaked at No. 12 on the Billboard 200 during a 37-week chart stay and was certified gold by RIAA.

Background
Al Kooper and Mike Bloomfield had previously worked together on the sessions for the ground-breaking classic Highway 61 Revisited by Bob Dylan, as well as playing in support of his controversial appearance at the Newport Folk Festival in July 1965. Kooper had recently left Blood, Sweat & Tears after recording their debut album with them, and was now working as an A&R man for Columbia. Bloomfield was about to leave Electric Flag, and at relative loose end. Kooper telephoned Bloomfield to see if he was free to come down to the studio and jam; Bloomfield agreed, leaving Kooper to handle the arrangements.

Kooper booked two days of studio time at CBS Columbia Square in May 1968, and recruited keyboardist Barry Goldberg and bassist Harvey Brooks, both members of the Electric Flag, along with well-known session drummer "Fast" Eddie Hoh. On the first day, the quintet recorded a group of mostly blues-based instrumental tracks. It included the modal excursion "His Holy Modal Majesty", which was a tribute to modal jazz musician John Coltrane, who had died the previous year, and was also reminiscent of "East-West" from the second Butterfield Blues Band album. On the second day, with the tapes ready to roll, Bloomfield returned to his home in Mill Valley, California, saying he had been unable to sleep.

Needing to have something to show for the second day of booked studio time, Kooper hastily called upon Stephen Stills, also in the process of leaving his band, Buffalo Springfield, to replace Bloomfield. Regrouping behind Stills, Kooper's session men cut mostly vocal tracks, including "It Takes a Lot to Laugh, It Takes a Train to Cry" from Highway 61 and a lengthy and atmospheric take of "Season of the Witch" by Donovan. Although Harvey Brooks's closing "Harvey's Tune" includes overdubbed horns added in New York City while the album was being mixed, the album only cost $13,000 to complete.

The success of the album opened the door for the "supergroup" concept of the late 1960s and 1970s, as exemplified by the likes of Blind Faith and Crosby, Stills & Nash. Kooper forgave Bloomfield, and the two of them made several concert appearances after the album was released. The results of one of those became the album The Live Adventures of Mike Bloomfield and Al Kooper.

Releases
Along with the stereo version, Super Session was released as a 4-channel quadraphonic version in the 1970s. The quadraphonic version was released on SQ matrix encoded vinyl and discrete 8-track cartridge tape. On April 8, 2003, Legacy Records reissued the album on compact disc with four bonus tracks, including both an outtake and a live track with Bloomfield, and two with the horn overdubs mixed out.

In the early 2000s, it was intended that it would be remixed for the new 5.1 channel version to be released on SACD. But in late 2004, Al Kooper commented:

Both 5.1 remixed SACDs were finally released in 2014 by Audio Fidelity.

Critical reception

Track listing

2003 CD reissue

Personnel
 Al Koopervocals, piano, Hammond organ, Ondioline, electric guitar, twelve-string guitar
 Mike Bloomfieldelectric guitar on side one, reissue tracks 10, 12, 13
 Stephen Stillselectric guitar on side two, reissue track 11
 Barry Goldbergelectric piano on "Albert's Shuffle" and "Stop"
 Harvey Brooksbass guitar
 Eddie Hohdrums, percussion
Additional personnel
 Horn sectionunknown session players; arranged by Al Kooper and Joe Scott
 Fred Catero, Roy Haleeengineering
 Martin Greenblattdigital mastering

Charts

Certification

References

1968 debut albums
Al Kooper albums
Columbia Records albums
Stephen Stills albums
Mike Bloomfield albums
Albums produced by Al Kooper